Dolenji Novaki is a village in the Municipality  of Cerkno in the traditional Littoral region of Slovenia.

Franja Partisan Hospital is located in a valley north of the settlement.

Church

The parish church in the village is dedicated to Saint Thomas and belongs to the Koper Diocese.

References

External links 

Dolenji Novaki on Geopedia

Populated places in the Municipality of Cerkno